The Old Congregational Church  is an historic church building on Greenville Road (Rhode Island Route 116) in the Smithville-North Scituate village of Scituate, Rhode Island.  The wood-frame shingled church was designed by Clark Sayles (a protege of noted church-builder Elias Carter) and complete in 1831.  The church was regularly used in the 19th century, but attendance declined in the later years, and it was only occasional used until 1940, when it was given to the town. In 1974, the building was listed on National Register of Historic Places.

The Scituate Art Festival has been held on the church grounds every autumn since 1967. The art festival was founded to raise funds to restore the church interior.

See also
National Register of Historic Places listings in Providence County, Rhode Island

References

External links
National Register listing
Scituate Art Festival
History of the State of Rhode Island with Illustrations Albert J. Wright, Printer No. 79 Mille Street, corner of Federal, Boston. Hong, Wade & Co., Philadelphia 1878. "The History of Scituate."

Churches on the National Register of Historic Places in Rhode Island
Churches completed in 1836
19th-century churches in the United States
Churches in Providence County, Rhode Island
Buildings and structures in Scituate, Rhode Island
North Scituate, Rhode Island
National Register of Historic Places in Providence County, Rhode Island
Historic district contributing properties in Rhode Island
Congregational churches in Rhode Island